Scott Wastney (born 1970) is a New Zealand chess player who holds the title of FIDE Master (FM).

Chess career
Wastney has represented New Zealand in four Chess Olympiads between 1996 and 2002. His best result was at the 34th Chess Olympiad in Istanbul 2000 when he scored 6/9, finishing in 10th place on the 2nd reserve board.

Wastney won the New Zealand Chess Championship in Waitakere City 2000/01, in Wellington 2013 and in 2017.

Wastney scored 5.5/9, finishing 5th, in the Oceania Zonal Chess Championship on the Gold Coast, Queensland in 2001, and was awarded the FIDE Master (FM) title for his result.

Notable games
 Paul Garbett vs Scott Wastney, 109th NZ Championship, Christchurch (2001/02), Grünfeld Defense: Three Knights Variation, (D91), 0-1

References

External links
 

1970 births
Living people
New Zealand chess players
Chess FIDE Masters
Chess Olympiad competitors